Sampson Eduku is a Ghanaian professional footballer who recently played for Sekondi Hasaacas as a forward.

Club career

Early career
Eduku began his playing career in the Ghana with Eleven Wise.

Karela United FC 
He joined Premier League club Karela United FC before the start of the 2014-2015 Premier League season.

Elmina Sharks 
He joined Elmina Sharks on 8 February 2018, signing a two-year deal with an option of an additional year.

Sekondi Hasaacas FC 
On 27 December 2019, Sampson joined Sekondi Hasaacas FC. The forward signed a two-year contract.

References

1995 births
Living people
Ghana Premier League players
Ghanaian footballers
Karela United FC players
Sekondi Wise Fighters players
People from Sekondi-Takoradi
Association football forwards
Elmina Sharks F.C. players